Unrepentant may refer to:

Unrepentant (album) album by Greg Koch 2017
Unrepentant Geraldines album by Tori Amos 2014 
Unrepentant Geraldines Tour concert tour by Tori Amos 2014
Woes to the unrepentant cities text in Matthew's gospel

See also 
Repentance (disambiguation)

Disambiguation pages